Shanika Roberts-Odle is a Barbadian politician who is currently serving as a member of the Senate of Barbados since January 2022. She is a member of the First senate of Barbados constituted after Barbados became a republic by Prime Minister Mia Mottley. She is a member of the Barbados Labour Party. Previously she had served as the Administrator of the Barbados Medicinal Cannabis Licensing Authority.

References 

Living people
Barbadian politicians
Barbados Labour Party politicians
Year of birth missing (living people)

Members of the Senate of Barbados